Möttingen station is a railway station in the municipality of Möttingen, located in the Donau-Ries district in Bavaria, Germany. The station lies on the Ries Railway. The train services are operated by Go-Ahead Bayern.

References 

Railway stations in Bavaria
Buildings and structures in Donau-Ries